Funa is an area of the capital city of Kinshasa, Democratic Republic of the Congo, comprising seven of the city-province's twenty-four administrative divisions—the communes of Bandalungwa, Bumbu, Kalamu, Kasa-Vubu, Makala, Ngiri-Ngiri and Selembao.  It is one of the four so-called districts of Kinshasa. These were the administrative divisions of Kinshasa during much of the Mobutu years (1965-1997) and around which a number of government systems and services are still organized.  For instance, Funa makes up a twelve-member National Assembly constituency designated as Kinshasa II.  However, these districts are not part of Congo's territorial organization.

References

Districts of Kinshasa